TV Japan is a 24-hour Japanese-language television channel geared towards the Japanese diaspora in the USA and Canada. It is the North American carrier of the NHK World Premium service. The channel is owned by NHK CosmoMedia America Inc., a subsidiary of NHK Enterprises, the commercial arm of the Japan Broadcasting Corporation (NHK), Japan's national public broadcaster. It is available on many cable providers in the United States and Canada, and through U.S. satellite provider DirecTV.

While there are a handful of local and regional channels in the United States with primarily Japanese programming, TV Japan is the only such channel available nationwide in both the U.S. and Canada.

Programming

TV Japan airs various programs from Japan including news coverage from NHK, dramas, movies, children's programs, and entertainment shows. Programming is provided mainly by NHK, but some entertainment programs originate from commercial Japanese broadcasters including TBS, Nippon TV, TV Tokyo, Fuji Television and TV Asahi. Some programming is subtitled or dubbed into English, while NHK's main news programs are available with English translation on SAP, with the original Japanese presentation on the main audio channel. TV Japan also features extensive sports coverage including coverage of the Grand Sumo tournaments (with English commentary on SAP), Nippon Professional Baseball games and J-League soccer matches.

Free previews
TV Japan typically provides a free preview through most carrying service providers for approximately two weeks in April each year.

In response to the massive earthquake and tsunami that hit the Northern area of Japan on the afternoon of March 11, 2011, cable and satellite TV providers across the United States and Canada provided a free-to-air broadcast giving viewers who may have friends and family in Japan with the latest news and information via a live simulcast from parent NHK.

References

External links
 

NHK
Foreign-language television stations in the United States
Japanese-language television stations
Television channels and stations established in 1991
1991 establishments in Japan